Coronel Suárez is a city in Buenos Aires Province, Argentina. It is the administrative centre for Coronel Suárez Partido. Its population is largely made up of Argentines of Volga German descent.

In its surroundings, within Coronel Suárez Partido, are the 3 historic colonies founded by Volga Germans. The remaining inhabitants of these villages are the descendants of their founders who did not migrate to the city of Coronel Suárez itself or to other locations in the country.

Coronel Suárez has a population of 23,621 inhabitants (2010) and its main economic activities are related to agriculture and cattle raising. It is famous for its Polo Club, founded in 1929, whose team has achieved outstanding success over the years in the annual Argentine Open Polo Championship, the world's most important polo tournament, including winning the Championship for ten successive years between 1961 and 1970.

History 

The partido was created in 1882 by the government of Buenos Aires Province in Argentina who divided the territory of Tres Arroyos into the partidos of Tres Arroyos, Coronel Pringles and Coronel Suárez . The latter partido, and its main town, were named after Manuel Isidoro Suárez (1799–1846), a colonel in the Argentine Army who fought in the wars of independence against the Spanish and led the Peruvian and Colombian infantry to victory in the  Battle of Junín in the Junín Region of Peru on August 6, 1824. Colonel Suárez was the great grandfather of the writer Jorge Luis Borges.

The city was founded on 28 May 1883 by Eduardo Casey on the frontier of Indian territory and a fort was built beside the river Sauce Corto. From the early days it was settled by Volga German immigrants.

On 16 May 1884 a railway station was opened on the Olavarría to Bahía Blanca line, operated by the British-owned Buenos Aires Great Southern Railway. In 1907 a second station was opened on the French-owned Ferrocarril Rosario y Puerto Belgrano line.

Climate

Airfield
 Brig D Hector Eduardo Ruiz (SAZC)
 Elevation: 
 Paved runway, coordinates: 
 Runways: One paved runway,  ×

References

External links

 Coronel Suarez city website
 Radio Online of Coronel Suarez
 Argentina Turismo
 Diario Nuevo Día: Newspaper Coronel Suárez, Huanguelén and German Colonies
 Information on Coronel Suárez

Coronel Suárez Partido
Populated places established in 1883
1883 establishments in Argentina
Populated places in Buenos Aires Province
Volga German diaspora